Hell & Heaven Metal Fest (H&H, el Hell, or Festival Hell and Heaven) is an open air heavy metal music festival. It takes place annually during Fall or Spring, near Mexico City in Toluca, located in the State of Mexico, in the central part of the country. With over 30,000 festival visitors, it attracts metal music fans of all subgenres including thrash metal, black metal, death metal, power metal, gothic metal, folk metal, and even metalcore, nu metal, hard rock from all over the world.  The festival is mostly attended by a Mexican audience from all around the country, but attracts a large number of visitors from Central and South America, as well as fans from Europe and other parts of the world.

The festival was first held in 2010 as an attempt to create a large scale Metal event for the Latin American community, known for its loyal following to Metal resembling that of European Metal fans. By 2013 word of the event had expanded beyond the region's limits, and has come to include over 60 bands from Europe, Latin America, North America and Australasia. H&H has been held in March and lasts two days, during which the festival-goers camp on large camping grounds surrounding the actual festival area, full amenities, security, first aid, and handicapped access are provided, as well as a VIP lounge tent. Within the limits of the festival, a fair is set up to provide fans with amusement and entertainment rides between performances or to take a break from the ongoing mosh pit. Other visitor activities include: Skatepark, Wrestling matches, cock fights, open restaurants, among others.

Currently the organizers are conceptualizing a regional "festival opening act", as is the case with Wacken's Firefighters at the famous German extreme music festival.

The event continues to attract bigger names in Metal with bands from further distances traveling to perform here.  Events of this magnitude have demonstrated to provide economic benefits to the surrounding communities and regional tourism.

After several days of uncertainty, the 2014 festival was definitely canceled two days prior to start date. However, it has been announced that a replacement one-day festival will be held at the Autódromo Hermanos Rodríguez on 25 October 2014.

2010

Hell & Heaven Metal Fest 2010, the first incarnation of the festival, was held on Sunday, 17 October.

2011

Hell & Heaven Metal Fest 2011, was held on Wednesday, 11 November.

2012

Suspended

2013

Hell & Heaven Metal Fest 2013 was held from Saturday, 18 May to Sunday, 19 May.

2014
Cancelled 2 days before the anticipated date

Hell & Heaven Metal Fest 2014 was scheduled from Saturday, 15 March to Sunday, 16 March. This event was officially canceled on Thursday, 13 March.

Before the event's cancellation, the announced line-up was as follows:

Many of the performers from the planned Day 1 will perform at the 25 October replacement festival.

Replacement festival at October, 25th

2016

Hell & Heaven Metal Fest 2016, was held on Saturday, July, 23rd.

2018
The 2018 Hell and Heaven festival is sponsored by Corona and will be held at Autodrómo Hermanos Rodríguez in Mexico City on May 4 and 5, 2018.

2020
The 2020 edition took place on March 14 and 15, amid concerns for the fast-growing COVID-19 pandemic. The festival was originally scheduled to be held at the Oceania Park in Mexico City, but after the riots that occurred at this same site during the 2019 Knotfest meets Forcefest, the organizers decided to change the location to the Foro Pegaso in Toluca, 45 minutes outside of Mexico City. It also marks the 10th anniversary of the festival.
Cancellations amid COVID-19 occurred both days, but mostly on March 15. Bands that had to back out included acts such as Megadeth,  King Diamond, Cypress Hill, DevilDriver, Death Angel, and Heaven Shall Burn,

March 14, 2020

March 15, 2020

2022
The 2022 edition of Hell & Heaven 2022 was confirmed on February 3, 2022, resuming the first headliner that had been planned for the 2021 edition, which will be the American group: Slipknot. On August 25 of the same year, the poster for the 2022 edition was officially announced despite the delays of the festival organizers in which it will take place on December 2, 3 and 4 at Foro Pegaso, Toluca de Lerdo, Toluca, State of Mexico:

See also
 List of heavy metal festivals

References 

Music festivals established in 2010
Heavy metal festivals in Mexico
Rock festivals in Mexico
Festivals in Mexico City
Spring (season) events in Mexico